Chemin or Le Chemin may refer to:

Arts and media
Le chemin (Emmanuel Moire album), 2013 album by French singer Emmanuel Moire 
Le chemin (Kyo album), 2003 album by French band Kyo
"Le Chemin" (song), title song from same-titled Kyo album
Le Chemin de France (English The Flight to France), an 1887 adventure novel by Jules Verne

Places
 Chemin, Jura, France
 Chemin, Valais, Switzerland
 Le Chemin, France, commune in the Marne department in the Champagne-Ardenne region in north-eastern France

People with surname Chemin
 Ariane Chemin (born 1962), French journalist
 Jean-Yves Chemin (born 1959), French mathematician

Other uses
CheMin, short for Chemistry and Mineralogy, an instrument located in the interior of the Curiosity rover, that is exploring the surface of Gale crater on Mars

See also
Chemin de fer (disambiguation)